Lejunior (also known as Gano) is an unincorporated community in Harlan County, Kentucky, United States. Lejunior has a post office with ZIP code 40849.

References

Unincorporated communities in Harlan County, Kentucky
Unincorporated communities in Kentucky